Lewison is a surname. Notable people with the surname include:

Bernard Lewison (1902–1984), American politician and businessman
Ian Lewison (born 1981), English boxer
Jaren Lewison (born 2000), American actor
Kim Lewison (born 1952), British judge
Peter Lewison (born 1961), American fencer